Francisco Bruto da Costa is an Indian professional football manager who is the current (assistant coach) of Fortis FC. 

He was the head coach of SC East Bengal. The contract was mutually terminated on 21 November 2020. On 27 December 2020, Bruto joined Sheikh Russel KC as Assistant Coach cum Fitness Coach.

Coaching career
Bruto da Costa started his professional coaching journey with Salgaocar FC U18 team in 2001 and moved onto the Technical Director role in 2008 before leaving charge for the India U19 team assistant manager role in 2010.

Bruto has been with the youth groups of India team since 2010 with U19 and U16 teams, until in 2016 when he joined Indian Super League side NorthEast United FC as the assistant manager under Portuguese manager Nelo Vingada. He followed Nelo to Malaysia as the assistant manager in 2017 before moving to Sheikh Russel KC of the Bangladesh Premier League.

On 30 July 2020, Bruto joined East Bengal FC as the assistant manager. The contract was mutually terminated on 21 November 2020.

On 27 December 2020, Bruto joined Bangladesh Premier League side Sheikh Russel KC as assistant manager cum fitness coach.

On 26 September 2021, Bruto da Costa was appointed as the technical assistant of the Egypt national football team on recommendation from Nelo Vingada, who has been appointed as Egypt's strategic advisor and technical director.

References

External links
https://timesofindia.indiatimes.com/city/goa/francisco-joins-sheikh-russel-in-bangladesh/articleshow/79981803.cms

1981 births
Living people
Indian football coaches
Indian football managers
Indian expatriate football managers
East Bengal Club managers